Golan Pollack (born 10 September 1991 in Yehud, Israel) is an Israeli Olympic judoka. who competed in the half lightweight (under 66 kg) weight category.

Pollack won a bronze medal in the 2015 World Judo Championships. He represented Israel at the 2016 Summer Olympics. He is 1.75 m /5' 9" tall, and weighs 66 kg /146 lbs.

Judo career
Pollack won a gold medal at the 2009 Maccabiah Games in the 66 kg division.

At the 2011 World Judo Championships, Pollack reached the quarterfinals, where he was defeated by Miklós Ungvári of Hungary. At the 2012 Summer Olympics, Pollak lost in the first round to David Larose of France.

Pollack won the European Open in Sofia in 2014. On December 5, 2014, Pollack won a silver medal at the Tokyo Grand Slam.

On August 25, 2015, Pollack won a bronze medal in the 2015 World Judo Championships in Astana, Kazakhstan after defeating Davaadorjiin Tömörkhüleg of Mongolia. During that day he also beat Georgii Zantaraia of Ukraine, ranked number one in the world. He became the sixth Israeli to win a medal at the World Judo Championships, joining Yael Arad (1991, bronze; 1993, silver), Oren Smadja (1995, silver), Arik Zeevi (2001, silver), Alice Schlesinger (2009, bronze), and Yarden Gerbi (2013, gold; 2014, silver).

He won a silver medal at the Düsseldorf Grand Prix in 2016, losing in the final to world champion An Baul of Korea.

Pollack represented Israel at the 2016 Summer Olympics in judo, where he was ranked 6th. After receiving a first-round bye, he was eliminated by Zambia's Mathews Punza. His coach, former Olympic medalist Oren Smadja, said: “Golan used a move he shouldn’t have used and doesn’t usually use. The move doesn’t even have a name. It’s a move where you try to surprise your opponent by falling on your back on the mat, but it risks a lock, which is exactly what happened to Golan. Golan lost to himself, and his opponent got a gift." Pollack left the match in tears, and collapsed to his knees, hiding his face. He said: “I’m very disappointed, especially after all the long way I’ve come in the last four years.... I thank everyone for their support, and I’m sorry I’ve disappointed you.”

Medals
Source:

References

External links

 
 
 

1991 births
Living people
Israeli male judoka
Maccabiah Games medalists in judo
Maccabiah Games gold medalists for Israel
Competitors at the 2009 Maccabiah Games
Olympic judoka of Israel
Judoka at the 2012 Summer Olympics
Judoka at the 2016 Summer Olympics
European Games competitors for Israel
Judoka at the 2015 European Games
21st-century Israeli people